This is a list of species in the genus Pandanus.

A

Pandanus abathes H.St.John
Pandanus abbiwii Huynh
Pandanus acanthostylus Martelli
Pandanus acaulescens H.St.John
Pandanus acladus Merrill
Pandanus acuminatus Balf.f., hort. ex H.Wendl.
Pandanus adpressus H.St.John
Pandanus aecuatus H.St.John
Pandanus aggregatus Merrill & L.M.Perry
Pandanus akara H.St.John
Pandanus akeassii Huynh
Pandanus alatus H.St.John
Pandanus albifrons B.C.Stone
Pandanus albus hort. ex Steud.
Pandanus aldabraensis H.St.John
Pandanus alifer H.St.John
Pandanus alkemadei Martelli
Pandanus alpestris Martelli
Pandanus alticonvexus H.St.John
Pandanus altissimus Pancher ex Brongn., Solms
Pandanus alveatus H.St.John
Pandanus alveolatus Huynh
Pandanus amaryllidifolius Voigt, hort. ex H.Wendl.
Pandanus amaryllifolius Roxb. ex Lindl.
Pandanus amarylloides Parment. ex Desf.
Pandanus ambalavaoensis Huynh
Pandanus ambiobtusus H.St.John
Pandanus ambohitantelensis Huynh
Pandanus ambongensis Martelli
Pandanus amherstiae hort. ex H.Wendl.
Pandanus amicalis H.St.John
Pandanus amissus Huynh
Pandanus amnicola H.St.John
Pandanus amphitrios St.John
Pandanus analamazaotrensis Martelli
Pandanus analamerensis Huynh
Pandanus ananas Martelli
Pandanus andamanensis hort. ex Balf.f.
Pandanus andringitrensis Huynh
Pandanus angolensis Huynh
Pandanus angoramensis H.St.John
Pandanus angustifolius C.C.Gmel., hort. ex Steud.
Pandanus angustior St.John
Pandanus ankaranensis Callm. & Laivao
Pandanus anomesos H.St.John
Pandanus antaresensis H.St.John
Pandanus aphitrios St.John
Pandanus apicnos St.John
Pandanus apiculatus Merrill
Pandanus apoensis Martelli, Merrill
Pandanus aprilensis H.St.John
Pandanus aquaticus F.Muell.
Pandanus aragoensis Solms
Pandanus arapepe H.St.John
Pandanus archboldianus Merrill & L.M.Perry
Pandanus arenicola Huynh
Pandanus aridus H.St.John
Pandanus aristatus Martelli
Pandanus arrectialatus H.St.John
Pandanus assamensis H.St.John
Pandanus associatus Huynh
Pandanus assurgens H.St.John
Pandanus asteroeides H.St.John
Pandanus atomiferus H.St.John
Pandanus atropurpureus Merrill & L.M.Perry
Pandanus augustianus L.Linden & Rodigas.
Pandanus auritus H.St.John
Pandanus australis Prestoe
Pandanus austrosinensis T.L.Wu

B

Pandanus bakeri Warb.
Pandanus balansae Solms
Pandanus balenii Martelli
Pandanus balfourii Martelli
Pandanus bantamensis Koord.
Pandanus baptisti Hort.
Pandanus baptistii hort. ex Veitch
Pandanus barai Martelli
Pandanus barbellatus Huynh
Pandanus barkleyi Baif.f., Balf.f.
Pandanus basalticola H.St.John
Pandanus basedowii C.H.Wright
Pandanus basilocularis Martelli
Pandanus bathiei Martelli
Pandanus beccarii Solms
Pandanus beguinii Callm. & A.P.Keim
Pandanus belepensis Callm. & Munzinger
Pandanus bemarahensis Huynh
Pandanus benstoneoides Callm., Buerki & Phillipson
Pandanus bernardii H.St.John ex B.C.Stone
Pandanus betsibokaensis H.St.John
Pandanus bicarpelatus H.St.John
Pandanus biceps Stone & Guillaumet
Pandanus biconvexus St.John
Pandanus bicornis Ridl.
Pandanus bidrupaceus H.St.John
Pandanus bifidus H.St.John
Pandanus bilinearis H.St.John
Pandanus biliranensis Merrill
Pandanus bilobatus St.John ex Huynh
Pandanus bipollicaris H.St.John
Pandanus bipyramidatus Martelli
Pandanus bismarckensis H.St.John
Pandanus boemiensis Kanehira
Pandanus boivinii Solms
Pandanus boninensis Warb.
Pandanus borneensis Warb.
Pandanus botryoides Martelli
Pandanus bowersiae St.John
Pandanus brachiatus Martelli
Pandanus brachus H.St.John
Pandanus brachycarpus Martelli
Pandanus brachyphyllus Merrill & L.M.Perry
Pandanus brachyspathus Martelli
Pandanus bracteosus H.St.John
Pandanus brassii Martelli
Pandanus brevicornutus H.St.John
Pandanus breviendocarpicus H.St.John
Pandanus brevifrugalis Huynh
Pandanus brevistipes Martelli
Pandanus brevistylis H.St.John
Pandanus bromeliifolius Lodd. ex Desf.
Pandanus brongniartii H.St.John
Pandanus brookei Martelli
Pandanus brosimos Merrill & L.M.Perry
Pandanus bryanii H.St.John
Pandanus buinensis Merrill & L.M.Perry
Pandanus bullii Warb.
Pandanus burkillianus Ridl.
Pandanus burmanicus B.C.Stone
Pandanus busuanagensis Merrill
Pandanus butayei De Wild.
Pandanus buwaldae H.St.John

C

Pandanus calamianensis Merrill
Pandanus calathiphorus Balf.f., Gaudich.
Pandanus calceiformis Martelli
Pandanus calcicola Holttum & H.St.John
Pandanus calcis H.St.John
Pandanus callmanderiana Laivao & Buerki
Pandanus calostigma Martelli
Pandanus calvus B.C.Stone
Pandanus camarinensis Merrill
Pandanus cambodiaensis St.John
Pandanus campanulatus St.John
Pandanus canaranus Warb.
Pandanus candelabrum P.Beauv.
Pandanus capitellatus Merrill & L.M.Perry
Pandanus capusii Martelli
Pandanus caricosus Spreng.
Pandanus carmichaelii R.E.Vaughan & Wiehe
Pandanus carolinianus Martelli
Pandanus carrii H.St.John
Pandanus castaneus H.St.John & B.C.Stone
Pandanus caudatus Merrill
Pandanus cauliflorus Carm. ex Balf.f.
Pandanus cavatus H.St.John
Pandanus cephalotus Stone
Pandanus ceramensis Hort.
Pandanus ceramicus Hort.
Pandanus ceratostigma Martelli
Pandanus cernuus H.St.John
Pandanus ceylanicus Solms
Pandanus cheilostigma Stone
Pandanus chevalieri St.John ex Huynh
Pandanus chiliocarpus Stapf
Pandanus christmatensis Martelli
Pandanus cissei Huynh
Pandanus clandestinus Stone
Pandanus clarkei Stone
Pandanus clausus H.St.John
Pandanus clementis Merrill
Pandanus cocosensis H.St.John
Pandanus columellatus Huynh
Pandanus columnaeformis Fagerl.
Pandanus columnaris H.St.John
Pandanus comatus Martelli
Pandanus concavus H.St.John
Pandanus concidens Pritz.
Pandanus concinnus Merrill & L.M.Perry
Pandanus concretus Baker
Pandanus conglomeratus Balf.f.
Pandanus conicus H.St.John
Pandanus connatus H.St.John
Pandanus conoideus Lam., de Vries
Pandanus cookii Martelli
Pandanus coriaceus Huynh
Pandanus corneri Kanehira
Pandanus cornifer H.St.John
Pandanus corniferus H.St.John
Pandanus crassicollis Huynh
Pandanus crassilix Huynh
Pandanus crenifer H.St.John
Pandanus crinifolius Martelli
Pandanus croceus St.John
Pandanus cubicus H.St.John
Pandanus cumingianus Martelli
Pandanus cuneatus Huynh
Pandanus cuneiformis H.St.John
Pandanus cupribasalis H.St.John
Pandanus cuspidatus Hort.
Pandanus cyaneoglaucescens Martelli
Pandanus cylindratus H.St.John
Pandanus cylindricus hort. ex Balf.f.

D

Pandanus daenikeri H.St.John
Pandanus daitoensis Susanti & J.Miyam.
Pandanus dalatensis H.St.John
Pandanus dammannii H.St.John, Warb.
Pandanus darwinensis H.St.John
Pandanus dasodes H.St.John
Pandanus dasystigma Kanehira
Pandanus daulos H.St.John
Pandanus dauphinensis Martelli
Pandanus daymanensis H.St.John
Pandanus decastigma B.C.Stone
Pandanus decipiens Martelli
Pandanus decumbens Solms
Pandanus decus-montium Stone
Pandanus delatensis St.John
Pandanus deltoideus H.St.John ex B.C.Stone
Pandanus denudatus Huynh
Pandanus depauperatus Merrill
Pandanus dictyotus St.John ex B.C.Stone
Pandanus diffusus Martelli
Pandanus dinagatensis Merrill
Pandanus discoideus H.St.John
Pandanus discostigma Martelli
Pandanus distentus H.St.John
Pandanus diversus St.John
Pandanus djalonensis Huynh
Pandanus dolichopodus Merrill & L.M.Perry
Pandanus dorystigma Martelli
Pandanus drupaceus Thouars
Pandanus dubius Spreng.
Pandanus durio Martelli
Pandanus dyakeus St.John
Pandanus dyckioides Baker
Pandanus dyeri Hort.Sander

E

Pandanus ebra St.John
Pandanus echinodermops Holttum & H.St.John
Pandanus echinops Huynh
Pandanus edulis Thouars
Pandanus efateensis H.St.John
Pandanus elatus Ridl.
Pandanus elegantissimus Hort.
Pandanus elmeri H.St.John
Pandanus elura St.John
Pandanus emarginatus St.John
Pandanus embuensis H.St.John
Pandanus endeavorensis St.John
Pandanus ensifolius Thouars
Pandanus erectus H.St.John
Pandanus estellae Rozefelds et al 2022
Pandanus esculentus Martelli
Pandanus eumekes H.St.John
Pandanus exaltatus Blanco
Pandanus excavatus H.St.John
Pandanus exiguus Merrill & L.M.Perry
Pandanus eydouxia Balf.f.

F

Pandanus fanningensis H.St.John
Pandanus farakoensis Huynh
Pandanus faviger Backer
Pandanus fetosus Huynh
Pandanus feufol Kanehira
Pandanus fibrosus Gagnep.
Pandanus fidelis H.St.John
Pandanus flagellaris St.John, Stone
Pandanus flagellibracteatus Huynh
Pandanus flavocapitatus B.C.Stone
Pandanus flexibilis H.St.John
Pandanus floribundus Merrill & L.M.Perry
Pandanus forbesii Warb.
Pandanus forsteri C.Moore & F.Muell.
Pandanus fortis H.St.John
Pandanus foveolatus Kanehira
Pandanus freetownensis Huynh
Pandanus fruticosus H.St.John
Pandanus furcatus Roxb., Thwaites
Pandanus furvus H.St.John
Pandanus fusinus Martelli

G

Pandanus gabonensis Huynh
Pandanus galeatus H.St.John
Pandanus galorei Stone
Pandanus gazelleensis H.St.John
Pandanus gemmifer H.St.John
Pandanus gemmiferus H.St.John
Pandanus gibberosus H.St.John
Pandanus gilbertanus Martelli
Pandanus gillespiei H.St.John
Pandanus gladiifolius Martelli
Pandanus glaphyros H.St.John
Pandanus glaucescens Hort.
Pandanus glauciferus H.St.John
Pandanus glaucocephalus R.E.Vaughan & Wiehe
Pandanus glaucus H.St.John, hort. ex H.Wendl.
Pandanus globatus H.St.John
Pandanus gossweileri St.John ex Huynh
Pandanus gracilialatus H.St.John
Pandanus gracilis Blanco
Pandanus grallatus Stone
Pandanus graminifolius Kurz, hort. ex Miq.
Pandanus grandifolius H.St.John
Pandanus granulosus H.St.John
Pandanus grayorum Calim., Buerki & Gallaher
Pandanus grusonianus L.Linden & Rodigas
Pandanus guadalcanalius H.St.John
Pandanus guillaumetii Stone
Pandanus guineabissauensis Huynh
Pandanus gyraleos H.St.John

H

Pandanus habenaceus H.St.John
Pandanus hahnii Warb.
Pandanus hainanensis St.John
Pandanus halleorum B.C.Stone
Pandanus halmaherensis Callm. & A.P.Keim
Pandanus hansenii St.John
Pandanus hata H.St.John
Pandanus hazaing H.St.John
Pandanus helicoptus Kurz.
Pandanus helicopus Kurz ex Miq.
Pandanus hemisphaericus H.St.John
Pandanus hermaphroditus Martelli
Pandanus hermesii B.C.Stone
Pandanus hermsianus Martelli
Pandanus heterocarpus Balf.f.
Pandanus heterostigma (Martelli) Martelli
Pandanus hoffa Chapel. ex Bojer
Pandanus hooglandii H.St.John
Pandanus horizontalis H.St.John
Pandanus hornei Balf.f.
Pandanus hosokawai Kanehira
Pandanus houlletii Carrière
Pandanus humbertii Laivao, Callm. & Buerki
Pandanus humilior H.St.John
Pandanus hundleyi H.St.John
Pandanus huntii St.John
Pandanus huynhii Stone
Pandanus hystrix Martelli

I

Pandanus iceryi Horne ex Balf.f.
Pandanus ijzermannii Boerl. & Koord.
Pandanus imerinensis Martelli
Pandanus immersus Ridl.
Pandanus incertus R.E.Vaughan & Wiehe
Pandanus induratus H.St.John
Pandanus infracarnosus H.St.John
Pandanus insolitus Huynh
Pandanus insuetus Huynh
Pandanus integrifolius Lour. ex Steud.
Pandanus intricatus Martelli
Pandanus inundatus H.St.John
Pandanus involutus H.St.John
Pandanus irregularis Ridl.
Pandanus isabelensis Quisumb. & Merrill
Pandanus isalicus Huynh
Pandanus isis H.St.John
Pandanus iwen B.C.Stone
Pandanus izan H.St.John

J

Pandanus jaffrei H.St.John
Pandanus javanicus hort. ex H.Wendl.
Pandanus johorensis Martelli
Pandanus joskei Horne ex Balf.f.
Pandanus juia H.St.John
Pandanus julianettii Martelli
Pandanus juliferus Martelli

K

Pandanus kabaenaensis A.P.Keim
Pandanus kaernbachii Warb.
Pandanus kaida Kurz
Pandanus kajewskii Merrill & L.M.Perry
Pandanus kajui Beentje
Pandanus kamiae Stone
Pandanus kampotensis St.John
Pandanus kanehirae Martelli
Pandanus kardiakos H.St.John
Pandanus karisu St.John
Pandanus katatonos St.John
Pandanus kaviengensis H.St.John
Pandanus kedahensis H.St.John
Pandanus kerchovei L.Linden & Rodigas
Pandanus kimlangii Callm. & Laivao
Pandanus kinabaluensis St.John ex Stone
Pandanus kirkii Rendle
Pandanus klossii Ridl.
Pandanus koordersii Martelli
Pandanus kopiagoensis H.St.John
Pandanus korwae A.P.Keim
Pandanus krauelianus K.Schum.
Pandanus kuepferi Callm., Wohlh. & Laivao
Pandanus kusaicola Kanehira
Pandanus kyrtos St.John

L

Pandanus labyrinthicus Kurz ex Miq.
Pandanus lachaisei Huynh
Pandanus lacustris H.St.John
Pandanus lacuum H.St.John ex B.C.Stone
Pandanus laeensis St.John
Pandanus laferrerei Huynh
Pandanus lagenaeformis Balf.f.
Pandanus lageniformis (Gaudich.) Balf.f.
Pandanus lais Kurz, hort. ex Balf.f.
Pandanus lamekotensis Markgr.
Pandanus lamprocephalus Merrill & L.M.Perry
Pandanus lanensis St.John
Pandanus lanutooensis Martelli
Pandanus laosensis Martelli
Pandanus lateralis Martelli
Pandanus lateralistigma Huynh
Pandanus laticonvexus H.St.John
Pandanus latifolius Hort.Angl. ex Link, Loud. ex Steud.
Pandanus latiloculatus Huynh
Pandanus latistigmaticus Huynh
Pandanus laxespicatus Martelli
Pandanus leiophyllus Martelli
Pandanus leptocarpus Martelli
Pandanus leptocaulis Merrill & L.M.Perry
Pandanus leptopodus Martelli
Pandanus leram Jones ex Fontana, ex R.Millar, ex Voigt
Pandanus letocartiorum Callm. & Buerki
Pandanus leucanthus hort. ex H.Wendl.
Pandanus leuconotus B.C.Stone
Pandanus levuensis Martelli
Pandanus liberiensis Huynh
Pandanus libratus H.St.John
Pandanus lifouensis H.St.John
Pandanus ligulatus H.St.John
Pandanus limbatus Merrill & L.M.Perry
Pandanus linguiformis Stone
Pandanus linnei hort. ex Balf.f.
Pandanus listrotos H.St.John
Pandanus lividus hort. ex H.Wendl.
Pandanus livingstonianus Randle, Rendle
Pandanus loherianus Martelli.
Pandanus longecuspidatus Pic.Serm.
Pandanus longicaudatus Holttum & H.St.John
Pandanus longifolius Hort.Lodd. ex Steud.
Pandanus longipedunculatus Fagerl.
Pandanus longipes H.Perrier ex Martelli
Pandanus longissimepedunculatus Martelli
Pandanus longissimus H.St.John
Pandanus longistylus Martelli & Pic.Serm.
Pandanus lorencei Huynh
Pandanus luzonensis Merrill

M

Pandanus mac-gregorii Solms
Pandanus macer St.John
Pandanus mackeei H.St.John
Pandanus macrocarpus (Brongn.) Solms, Viellon, hort. ex Balf.f.
Pandanus macrophyllus Martelli
Pandanus macrostigma Martelli
Pandanus madagascariensis Balf.f. ex Warb.
Pandanus maevaranensis Martelli
Pandanus magdaliaris H.St.John
Pandanus magnicavernosus H.St.John
Pandanus magnus St.John
Pandanus majungensis Huynh
Pandanus malaitensis St.John
Pandanus malensis Huynh
Pandanus malgassicus Pic.Serm.
Pandanus malgrasii Huynh
Pandanus mammillaris Martelli & Pic.Serm.
Pandanus manambolensis Huynh
Pandanus mandalayensis H.St.John
Pandanus manensis Martelll
Pandanus mangalorensis Nadaf & Zanan
Pandanus mangokensis Martelli
Pandanus mapola Martelli
Pandanus mareensis H.St.John
Pandanus marginatus H.St.John, Roxb.
Pandanus marinus H.St.John
Pandanus marojejicus Callm. & Laivao
Pandanus maromokotrensis Callm. & Wohlh.
Pandanus martellii Elmer
Pandanus martinianus Nadaf & Zanan
Pandanus mauricei H.St.John
Pandanus mauritianus Hort.Berol. ex H.Wendl.
Pandanus maximus Martelli
Pandanus mayotteensis H.St.John
Pandanus mc-keei H.St.John
Pandanus medialis H.St.John
Pandanus megacarpus Martelli
Pandanus melius H.St.John
Pandanus membranaceus Huynh
Pandanus menicostigma Merrill & L.M.Perry
Pandanus mesos H.St.John
Pandanus metaceus H.St.John
Pandanus meuoa Kanehira
Pandanus micracanthus Warb.
Pandanus microcarpus Balf.f.
Pandanus microcephalus Baker
Pandanus microstigma Balf.f.
Pandanus militaris Balf.f., O.Warburg
Pandanus minda Pancher ex Brongn.
Pandanus mindanaensis Martelli
Pandanus minimus H.St.John
Pandanus minor Buch.-Ham. ex Wall.
Pandanus missorum H.St.John
Pandanus mkadi H.St.John
Pandanus moalaensis H.St.John
Pandanus monophalanx Fagerl.
Pandanus montanus Bory
Pandanus montuensis St.John
Pandanus mosambicus H.St.John
Pandanus moschatus hort. ex H.Wendl.
Pandanus mulleolus H.St.John
Pandanus multibracteatus Merrill
Pandanus multidentatus H.St.John
Pandanus multidrupaceus H.St.John
Pandanus multifurcatus Fagerl.
Pandanus multispicatus Balf.f.
Pandanus muralis Huynh
Pandanus muricatus Thouars
Pandanus mussauensis H.St.John
Pandanus myriocarpus Baker

N

Pandanus nabirensis Kanehira
Pandanus namakiensis Martelli
Pandanus nanofrutex B.C.Stone
Pandanus navicularis Stone
Pandanus navigatorum Martelli
Pandanus nemoralis Merrill & L.M.Perry
Pandanus neoleptopodus Pic.Serm.
Pandanus neomecklenburgensis H.St.John
Pandanus nervosus B.C.Stone
Pandanus ngunaensis H.St.John
Pandanus nigeriensis Huynh.
Pandanus nitidus Kurz
Pandanus nobilis Quisumb. & Merrill
Pandanus nogarete H.St.John
Pandanus noumeaensis H.St.John
Pandanus noviberiensis St.John
Pandanus novibritannicus H.St.John
Pandanus novohibernicus (Martelli) Martelli
Pandanus nusbaumeri Callm. & L.Gaut.

O

Pandanus obconicus H.St.John
Pandanus obeliscus Thouars
Pandanus oblatus H.St.John
Pandanus oblongicapitellatus Huynh
Pandanus oblongicephalus Huynh
Pandanus oblongus Balf.f.
Pandanus obovatus H.St.John
Pandanus obsoletus R.E.Vaughan & Wiehe
Pandanus occultus Merrill
Pandanus odoardii Martelli
Pandanus odoratissimus Blume, Hort.Herrenh. ex H.Wendl., Noronha, St.John
Pandanus odorifer (Forssk.) Kuntze
Pandanus olango Blanco ex Vidal & Garcia
Pandanus oligocarpus Martelli
Pandanus oligocephalus Baker
Pandanus onesuaensis H.St.John
Pandanus opeatos H.St.John
Pandanus orculiformis Kanehira
Pandanus oresbois B.C.Stone
Pandanus ornatus Kurz
Pandanus ouveaensis H.St.John
Pandanus oviger Martelli ex Koord.

P

Pandanus palakkadensis Nadaf, Zanan & Wakte
Pandanus palawensis Martelli
Pandanus pallidus Merrill
Pandanus paloensis Elmer
Pandanus paludisylvestris H.St.John
Pandanus paludosus Merrill & L.M.Perry
Pandanus palustris Thouars
Pandanus panayensis Merrill
Pandanus pancheri Balf.f.
Pandanus papuanus H.St.John, Solms
Pandanus paracalensis Merrill
Pandanus parachevalieri Huynh
Pandanus parallellus Kanehira
Pandanus paramekos St.John
Pandanus parasiticus Noronha
Pandanus parou H.St.John
Pandanus parvicentralis Huynh
Pandanus patelliformis Merrill
Pandanus patina Martelli
Pandanus paucicarpellatus H.St.John
Pandanus paucifrugifer H.St.John
Pandanus peekelii H.St.John
Pandanus penangensis Ridl.
Pandanus pendulinus Martelli
Pandanus penetrans H.St.John
Pandanus penicillus Martelli
Pandanus pentodon Ridl.
Pandanus perrieri Martelli.
Pandanus pervilleanus Kurz, Solms
Pandanus petraeus H.St.John
Pandanus petrosus Martelli
Pandanus peyrierasii Stone & Guillaumet
Pandanus philippinensis Merrill
Pandanus pia H.St.John
Pandanus pinensis H.St.John
Pandanus piniformis Holttum & H.St.John
Pandanus piricus H.St.John
Pandanus pistikos H.St.John
Pandanus pistos H.St.John
Pandanus pitcairnensis H.St.John
Pandanus planatus H.St.John
Pandanus platycarpus Warb.
Pandanus platyphyllus Martelli
Pandanus pleiocephalus Martelli ex Fagerl.
Pandanus pluriaculeatus Huynh
Pandanus pluriloculatus H.St.John
Pandanus plurirostratus H.St.John
Pandanus polyacris Martelli
Pandanus polycephalus Lam.
Pandanus polyglossus Martelli
Pandanus polyryzos Noronha ex Thouars
Pandanus poranaliva St.John
Pandanus porcorum St.John
Pandanus porteanus Lescuyer ex Herincq
Pandanus prainii Martelli
Pandanus princeps Hort.Bull., Stone
Pandanus pristis Stone
Pandanus pritchardae H.St.John
Pandanus problematicus Huynh
Pandanus profundior H.St.John
Pandanus proliferus hort. ex H.Wendl.
Pandanus prostratus Balf f.
Pandanus pseudobathiei Pic.Serm.
Pandanus pseudochevalieri Huynh
Pandanus pseudocollinus Pic.Serm.
Pandanus pseudolais Warb.
Pandanus pseudomontanus Bosser & J.Guého
Pandanus pseudopapuanus Solms
Pandanus pugnax B.C.Stone
Pandanus pukapukaensis H.St.John
Pandanus pulcher Martelli
Pandanus punctulatus Martelli
Pandanus pungens Kanehira
Pandanus puniceus H.St.John
Pandanus punicularis J.St.-Hil.
Pandanus purpurascens Thouars
Pandanus purpureus H.St.John
Pandanus pweleensis H.St.John
Pandanus pygmaeus Hook., Thouars
Pandanus pyramidalis Barkly ex Balf.f.
Pandanus pyramidos H.St.John

Q

Pandanus quadrifidus B.C.Stone, St.John
Pandanus quinarius H.St.John

R

Pandanus rabaiensis Rendle
Pandanus rabanlensis St.John
Pandanus rabaulensis H.St.John
Pandanus radians H.St.John
Pandanus radicans Blanco
Pandanus radiciferus H.St.John
Pandanus radifer H.St.John
Pandanus radula Warb.
Pandanus rambu H.St.John
Pandanus ramosii Merrill
Pandanus rapensis F.Br.
Pandanus raynalii Huynh
Pandanus reburrus St.John
Pandanus recavilapideus H.St.John
Pandanus recavisaxosus H.St.John
Pandanus rechingeri Martelli
Pandanus reclinatus Martelli
Pandanus rectus H.St.John
Pandanus reflexus Lodd. ex Desf.
Pandanus regalis B.C.Stone
Pandanus reineckei Warb.
Pandanus resinosus H.St.John
Pandanus reticulatus Vieill.
Pandanus reticulosus H.St.John
Pandanus retusus H.St.John
Pandanus rex Stone
Pandanus rheophilus B.C.Stone
Pandanus rhopalocarpus Martelli
Pandanus rigidifolius R.E.Vaughan & Wiehe
Pandanus robinsonii Merrill
Pandanus rollotii Martelli
Pandanus roseus St.John
Pandanus rostratus Martelli
Pandanus rotumaensis H.St.John
Pandanus rubellus H.St.John
Pandanus rubricinctus H.St.John
Pandanus rubrispicatus H.St.John
Pandanus rufus H.St.John
Pandanus rugulosus H.St.John
Pandanus russow Miq. ex Ridl.

S

Pandanus sabulorum Martelli
Pandanus salailuaensis Martelli
Pandanus saliens H.St.John
Pandanus sambiranensis Martelli
Pandanus samoensis Warb.
Pandanus sanctimariae H.St.John
Pandanus sandakanensis Merrill
Pandanus sanderi Hort.Sand. ex Mast. 1898
Pandanus sarasinorum Warb.
Pandanus satabiei Huynh
Pandanus sattelbergensis H.St.John
Pandanus satthwa H.St.John
Pandanus saxatilis Martelli
Pandanus scaber H.St.John
Pandanus scabrifolius Martelli ex Koord.
Pandanus schoddei St.John
Pandanus scopula Warb.
Pandanus scopulorum Martelli
Pandanus scortechini Martelli
Pandanus sechellarum Balf.f.
Pandanus section 
Pandanus semiarmatus H.St.John
Pandanus semidivisus H.St.John
Pandanus semipilaris H.St.John
Pandanus semiplantus H.St.John
Pandanus senegalensis St.John ex Huynh
Pandanus separatus B.C.Stone
Pandanus sermollianus Callm. & Buerki
Pandanus serpentinicus H.St.John
Pandanus serratus H.St.John
Pandanus sessilis Bojer, hort. ex H.Wendl.
Pandanus sexangularis H.St.John
Pandanus sibuyanensis Martelli
Pandanus sierraleonensis Huynh
Pandanus sigmoideus H.St.John
Pandanus sikassoensis Huynh
Pandanus silvanus Huynh
Pandanus simplex Merrill
Pandanus singaporensis Kanehira
Pandanus sinicola A.C.Sm.
Pandanus solms-laubachii F.Muell., Warb.
Pandanus solomonensis B.C.Stone, St.John
Pandanus sparganioides Baker
Pandanus spathulatus Martelli
Pandanus sphaerocephalus Pancher ex (Brongn.) Solms
Pandanus sphaeroideus Thouars
Pandanus spheniskos H.St.John
Pandanus spicatus H.St.John
Pandanus spicifer St.John
Pandanus spinifer Warb
Pandanus spinistigmaticus Fagerl.
Pandanus spiralis R.Br., hort. ex H.Wendl.
Pandanus spissus H.St.John
Pandanus spodiophyllus St.John
Pandanus spurius Steud.
Pandanus stellaris St.John
Pandanus stellatus Martelli
Pandanus stelliger Ridl.
Pandanus stenophyllus Kurz
Pandanus stipiformis H.St.John
Pandanus stolonifer H.St.John
Pandanus subacaulis Merrill
Pandanus subcylindricus H.St.John
Pandanus subglobosus H.St.John
Pandanus subulorum Martelli
Pandanus sulawesicus B.C.Stone
Pandanus sulcatus H.St.John
Pandanus sumatranus Martelli
Pandanus sylvestris Bory
Pandanus sylvicola Huynh

T

Pandanus tabellarius Huynh
Pandanus taiwanicus H.St.John
Pandanus taluucensis Callm.
Pandanus taveuniensis H.St.John
Pandanus tazoanii Callm. & Wohlh.
Pandanus tectorius B.C.Stone, Parkinson ex Du Roi
Pandanus tenuiflagellatus Huynh
Pandanus tenuifolius Balf f.Linden ex Dufresne
Pandanus tenuimarginatus Huynh
Pandanus tenuipedunculatus Merrill
Pandanus terrae-reginae H.St.John
Pandanus tertianus St.John
Pandanus teuszii Warb.
Pandanus thomensis Henriq., Solms
Pandanus tiassaleensis Huynh
Pandanus tolanarensis Huynh
Pandanus toliarensis Huynh
Pandanus tongatapuensis H.St.John
Pandanus tonkinensis B.C.Stone, Martelli
Pandanus trialveatus B.C.Stone
Pandanus triangularis H.St.John ex Huynh
Pandanus tricolor H.St.John
Pandanus tsaratananensis Martelli
Pandanus tsingycola Callm. & Nusb.
Pandanus tubulatus Huynh
Pandanus turbinatus Lodd. ex Steud.
Pandanus turritus Martelli
Pandanus tutuilaensis Martelli

U

Pandanus uliginosus St.John
Pandanus umbonatus Quisumb. & Merrill
Pandanus unguifer Hook.f.
Pandanus unicornutus H.St.John
Pandanus urdanetensis Elmer
Pandanus urophyllus Hance
Pandanus utilis Bory
Pandanus utiyamai Kanehira

V

Pandanus vaho St.John
Pandanus validus Huynh & Callm.
Pandanus valleinlaris St.John
Pandanus vandamii Martelli & Pic.Serm.
Pandanus vandermeeschii Balf.f.
Pandanus vangeertii Hort.
Pandanus variabilis Martelli
Pandanus vavauensis H.St.John
Pandanus veillonii H.St.John
Pandanus verecundus Stone
Pandanus verticalis H.St.John
Pandanus verus L.
Pandanus vieillardii Martelli
Pandanus vinaceus Stone
Pandanus violaceus H.St.John
Pandanus viridarifactus H.St.John
Pandanus viscidus Pancher ex (Brongn.) Panch. ex Balf.f., Solms
Pandanus viscius (Brongn.) Solms
Pandanus vitiensis Martelli
Pandanus vittariifolius Bojer
Pandanus vogelensis H.St.John

W

Pandanus wavrinianus Hort.Sand.
Pandanus welwitschii Rendle
Pandanus whitmeeanus Martelli
Pandanus wiehei Bosser & J.Guého
Pandanus woodlarkensis H.St.John

Y

Pandanus yandeensis H.St.John
Pandanus yasawaensis H.St.John
Pandanus yirrkalaensis H.St.John
Pandanus yoshioi H.St.John
Pandanus yuleensis H.St.John
Pandanus yunnanensis St.John
Pandanus yvanii Solms

Z

Pandanus zamboangensis Martelli
Pandanus zanzibarensis H.St.John
Pandanus zeylanicus Hook.f.

References

Pandanus